Pankaj Joshi (born 8 October 1980) is an Indian former cricketer. He played ten first-class matches for Delhi between 1996 and 2001.

See also
 List of Delhi cricketers

References

External links
 

1980 births
Cricketers from Delhi
Delhi cricketers
Living people